Cambodia is divided into 25 provinces. The capital Phnom Penh is not a province but an "autonomous municipality" (lit. 'Capital'), equivalent to a province governmentally and administered at the same level as the other 24 provinces.

Phnom Penh has both the highest population and the highest population density of all provinces, but is the second smallest in land area. The largest province by area is Mondulkiri and the smallest is Kep which is also the least populated province. Mondulkiri has the lowest population density.

Each province is administered by a governor, who is nominated by the Ministry of Interior, subject to approval by the Prime Minister.

Provinces are divided into districts ( srok). The districts in Phnom Penh are called khan normally written as for addresses in English followed by the districts’ names (Ex: Khan Chamkar Mon; lit. 'Chamkar Mon District'). The number of districts in each province varies, from two in the smallest provinces to 14 in Battambang, Prey Veng, and Siem Reap. Further subdivision levels are communes ( khum), and further subdivided into villages (phum). In Phnom Penh, sangkat is used in the place of khum and, similar to khan, normally preferred for writing addresses in English (Ex: Sangkat Mittapheap; lit. 'Mittapheap Commune').


List of provinces

History 
 1974: The Khmer Rouge government did away with the former Cambodian traditional administrative divisions. Instead of provinces, Democratic Kampuchea was divided into seven geographic zones: the Northwest, the North, the Northeast, the East, the Southwest, the West, and the Centre. These zones were derived from divisions established by the Khmer Rouge when they fought against the Khmer Republic during the Cambodian Civil War.

 2008: On 22 December 2008, King Norodom Sihamoni signed a decree that changed the municipalities of Kep, Pailin and Sihanoukville into provincial municipalities, as well as adjusting several provincial borders.

 2013: On 31 December 2013, King Norodom Sihamoni signed a decree that split Kampong Cham into two provinces: Kampong Cham (west of the Mekong River) and Tboung Khmum (east of the Mekong River).

 2018: In September 2018, Interior Minister Sar Kheng proposed establishing two more provinces, with areas taken from Kandal, Mondulkiri, and Ratanakiri. Prime Minister Hun Sen rejected the plan.

See also 
 List of Cambodian provinces by Human Development Index
 Subdivisions of Cambodia
 List of Cambodian districts and sections
 Communes of Cambodia
 ISO 3166-2:KH

References

External links 
 Statoid site

 
Subdivisions of Cambodia
Provinces
Cambodia 1
Provinces, Cambodia